Liechtenstein will be represented by 1 athlete at the 2010 European Athletics Championships held in Barcelona, Spain.

Participants

Results

References 
 Participants list (men)
 Participants list (women)

Nations at the 2010 European Athletics Championships
2010
European Athletics Championships